Le Lit is a 1982 drama film directed by Marion Hänsel and based on the 1960 novel of the same name by Dominique Rolin. The film starred Heinz Bennent, Natasha Parry, and Johan Leysen. Le Lit received the André Cavens Award for Best Film given by the Belgian Film Critics Association (UCC).

Cast 
 Heinz Bennent as Martin
 Natasha Parry as Eva
 Johan Leysen as Dr. Bruno Nanteuil
 Francine Blistin as Caroline
 Patrick Massieu as Tardif
 Marion Hänsel as Tilly

References

External links 
 

1982 films
1982 drama films
Belgian drama films
Swiss drama films
1980s French-language films
French-language Swiss films
French-language Belgian films
Films directed by Marion Hänsel